Batman: Digital Justice is a graphic novel published by DC Comics in 1990 in both hardback and paperback forms.  It was written and illustrated by Pepe Moreno entirely using computer hardware, software and techniques. The story takes place outside regular DC continuity, but is not an Elseworlds title.

Plot summary
The book is set in a future Gotham City "at the end of the next century" (the 21st) dominated by high technology, particularly computer networks and their human controllers, long after the original Batman has died. The story revolves around James Gordon, Gotham City Police Department detective and grandson of Commissioner James Gordon, who takes on the identity of the Batman to free the city from a sentient computer virus crafted by the Joker, also now long dead, and to avenge the death of his partner Lena Schwartz. He is aided by a self-aware computer called the Batcomp, programmed by the late Bruce Wayne, and a robot called Alfred (after Wayne's also deceased butler Alfred Pennyworth), both residing in the Batcave under a now long-abandoned Wayne Manor. Joining Gordon in his new crusade against crime and the city's corrupt government are a teenage street-punk informant, who becomes the new Robin; and a female pop music superstar named Sheila Romero (stage name Gata), who becomes the new Catwoman and, while being his adversary at first, eventually becomes Gordon's lover and ally.

Characters
James Gordon/Batman
Lena Schwartz
Robert Chang/Robin
Harold Grover
Paul Fahmy/Know Man
Sheila Romero/Gata/Catwoman
Maria Romero/Madam X
Luke Krater/Law Man
Hiroshi Basho/Mob Lord
Jackie Becker/Media Man

1990 comics debuts
Batman graphic novels
Cyberpunk comics